The 141st Battalion, CEF was a unit in the Canadian Expeditionary Force during the First World War.

History 
Based in Fort Frances, Ontario, the unit began recruiting in late 1915 in Rainy River District of northern Ontario.  After sailing to England in April 1917, the battalion was absorbed into the 18th Reserve Battalion on May 7, 1917.  The 141st Battalion, CEF had one Officer Commanding: Lieut-Col. D. C. McKenzie.

Perpetuation 
The perpetuation of the battalion was assigned in 1920 to the Rainy River and Kenora Regiment. A year later in 1921, the perpetuation was reassigned to the Lake Superior Regiment, which is now named the Lake Superior Scottish Regiment.
 1920–1921: 1st Battalion (141st Battalion, CEF), The Rainy River and Kenora Regiment
 1921–1936: 2nd Battalion (141st Battalion, CEF), The Lake Superior Regiment
 1936–1949: The Lake Superior Regiment
 1949–present: The Lake Superior Scottish Regiment

See also 

 List of infantry battalions in the Canadian Expeditionary Force

References

Meek, John F. Over the Top! The Canadian Infantry in the First World War. Orangeville, Ont.: The Author, 1971.

Battalions of the Canadian Expeditionary Force
Lake Superior Scottish Regiment